The Canadian Numbering Administration Consortium is the corporation responsible for administering Canada's telecommunication numbering resources.  The CNA is regulated by the Canadian Radio-television and Telecommunications Commission (CRTC). CNAC is headquartered in The Glebe area of Ottawa, Ontario.

The CNAC selects and funds a neutral administrator known as the Canadian Numbering Administrator who performs the actual administrative duties.  The CNAC is also responsible for paying the Canadian portion of the North American Numbering Plan Administration (NANPA) costs, which are funded by Canadian telecommunication service providers (TSP).

See also 
 List of NANP area codes
 Telephone numbers in Canada
 North American Numbering Plan expansion

References

External links 
CNAC website
North American Numbering Plan Administration (NANPA)

North American Numbering Plan
Telecommunications in Canada